Anagogic Tyranny is the third studio album by the Canadian technical death metal band Sympathy, released on November 11, 2008, on Bombworks Records. The album features lead guitar work by the new member Jeff Lewis, and drumming work by Into Eternity member Jim Austin. The cover artwork was done by Jeff Arwadi of Soundmind Graphics and the band Kekal. In some interviews, Dharok stated the songs are character studies based on the book series Prince of Nothing.

Track listing
Insurrection 	
And All Flesh 	
On a Bloodied Cross 	
Ours the Grave 	
Perfection in Death 	
Enslaved by Depravity 	
Underworld 	
Forgotten Temples 	
The Iscariot Aspect 	
Potter's Field

Musicians
Dharok - rhythm guitars and vocals
Jeff Lewis - rhythm and lead guitars
Jim Austin - drums

References

External links
Anagogic Tyranny at Bombworks Records' site
Anagogic Tyranny at Encyclopaedia Metallum

2008 albums
Sympathy (band) albums